Leukocyte-promoting factor, more commonly known as leukopoietin, is a category of substances produced by neutrophils when they encounter a foreign antigen. Leukopoietin stimulates the bone marrow to increase the rate of leukopoiesis in order to replace the neutrophils that will inevitably be lost when they begin to phagocytose the foreign antigens.

Leukocyte-promoting factors include colony stimulating factors (CSFs) (produced by monocytes and T lymphocytes), interleukins  (produced by monocytes, macrophages, and endothelial cells), prostaglandins, and lactoferrin.

See also
 White blood cell
 Leukocytosis
 Complete blood count
 Indium-111 WBC scan
 Leukocyte extravasation

References 

Cytokines
Hormones of the blood
Hematology